Osmotherley may refer to:

Osmotherley, North Yorkshire, an English village and civil parish
Osmotherley, Cumbria, an English civil parish

See also
Osmotherly Rules, a set of rules regarding how UK civil servants interact with Parliament